Keng No Mai Sai Yanang (Bamboo soup and yanang leaf extract) (Lao: ແກງຫນໍ່ໄມ້ໃສ່ຢານາງ)) also known as Gaeng Nor Mai, Gaeng Naw Mai, Gaeng Nomai, Kaeng No Mai, Kaeng Nomai, Kaeng Lao or Lao bamboo soup is a popular and traditional soup from Laos. The traditional recipe for keng no mai served to Laotian royalties can be found in a collection of hand written recipes from Phia Sing(1898-1967), the king's personal chef and master of ceremonies. Phia Sing's hand written recipes were complied and published for the first time in 1981.  The dish can also be found among the Lao ethnic region of Northeastern Thailand (Isan).

Keng no mai is made by cooking bamboo shoot, mushrooms (oysters, straw, and wood ears), okra, angled gourd, pumpkin, juices (or extract) obtained from the yanang leaves, and padaek in pork, chicken or beef broth. The soup is thicken with crushed up sticky rice flour. According to personal tastes, quail eggs, eggplant, climbing wattle, and kajeng (or rice paddy herb) are also added to the soup.

References

Laotian soups